Downsview Secondary School (Downsview SS, DSS, or Downsview in short), formerly Downsview Collegiate Institute, is a semestered public secondary school in Toronto, Ontario, Canada.

Africentric  Program
In 2013, TDSB proposed Downsview Secondary as the second school in the city to offer Africentric program.

References

High schools in Toronto
Schools in the TDSB
Educational institutions established in 1955
1955 establishments in Ontario